Mojtame-e Maskuni-ye Ti Paba Valfazal (also Romanized as Mojtamʿe-e Masḵūnī Tī Pāba Vālafz̤al; also known as Paba Valfazal Residential Complex) is a village in Koregah-e Gharbi Rural District, in the Central District of Khorramabad County, Lorestan Province, Iran. At the 2006 census, its population was 377, in 97 families.

References 

Towns and villages in Khorramabad County